The Blackface  or Scottish Blackface is a British breed of sheep. It is the most common sheep breed of the United Kingdom. Despite the name, it did not originate in Scotland, but south of the border.

History 

The origins of the breed are uncertain. It originated south of the Anglo-Scottish border, and did not arrive in the Highlands of Scotland until the second half of the eighteenth century. It replaced the earlier Scottish Dun-face or Old Scottish Shortwool, a Northern European short-tailed sheep type probably similar to the modern Shetland.

There are several types of Blackface in the United Kingdom, including the Perth variety, which is large-framed and coarse-woollen, and mainly found in north-east Scotland, Devon, Cornwall and Northern Ireland; the medium-framed Lanark type, with shorter wool, found in much of Scotland and in parts of Ireland; and the Northumberland Blackface, which is large with relatively soft wool.

Characteristics 

The Blackface is always horned. The face and legs are black, sometimes with white markings.

Use 

The Blackface is reared principally for meat production, usually through cross-breeding. Blackface ewes are commonly put to Blue-faced Leicester rams to produce the Scottish Mule or Scottish Greyface. Ewes of this cross-breed retain some characteristics of each parent – maternal qualities and hardiness from the dam, and fecundity and meat quality from the sire – and are much used in commercial lowland sheep-rearing.

It may be used for mattresses, for carpets, or to make tweed.

See also 
 Valais Blacknose

References

External links 

Sheep breeds originating in Scotland
Sheep breeds